WMDJ-FM (100.1 FM) is a radio station  broadcasting a country music format. Licensed to Allen, Kentucky, United States, the station is owned by Floyd County Broadcasting Co., Inc. and features programming from Fox News Radio and the Cincinnati Reds Radio Network.

References

External links

MDJ-FM